William Rufus "Shin" Norman (born March 3, 1886) was a Negro leagues pitcher for several years before the founding of the first Negro National League.

The 20-year-old Norman was pitching for Topeka Jack Johnson's Topeka Giants when the team toured Nebraska, Iowa, Illinois, Missouri and Kansas in 1906. The tour included several games in Chicago, including one with the Leland Giants, a team Norman would move to in the next season.

He pitched for the Leland Giants, the Chicago Union Giants, and the Kansas City Giants.

References

External links

1886 births
Year of death missing
Negro league baseball managers
Leland Giants players
Baseball players from Kansas
Sportspeople from Topeka, Kansas